The Society of Western Artists refers to two distinct and wholly unrelated organizations in the history of American art:
New Location:  527 San Mateo Avenue, San Bruno, CA 94066   650-225-9250
As of April 1, 2015

Society of Western Artists (1896-1914)
Society of Western Artists (1939-Present)

American artist groups and collectives